War Eternal is the ninth studio album by Swedish melodic death metal band Arch Enemy, which was released first in Japan on 4 June 2014 by Century Media. It is the first Arch Enemy album in 15 years since Burning Bridges to feature a new line-up; Alissa White-Gluz took over on vocals after former long-time vocalist Angela Gossow stepped down from vocal duties to be the band's business manager. Additionally, ex-Arsis guitarist Nick Cordle replaced Christopher Amott in 2012. Cordle ultimately left the band just before their European tour and was replaced by former Nevermore guitarist Jeff Loomis.

Background and development
On 3 March 2014 the band revealed the album's title War Eternal and the release date.

On 17 March 2014, Angela Gossow released a statement announcing her departure from the group and welcoming her replacement, former vocalist of Canadian melodic death metal band The Agonist, Alissa White-Gluz. In the statement, she wrote that while she had enjoyed her time with the group, it was time for her to move on, be with her family and pursue other interests. Gossow did confirm that she would remain Arch Enemy's business manager, and would be "passing the torch to the super talented Alissa White-Gluz, whom I’ve known as a dear friend and a superb vocalist for many years. I always thought she deserved a chance to shine – and now she’s getting it. Just like I got that chance back in 2001."

White-Gluz also released a statement saying:

Artwork
The cover is set in a church that represents a rat who has a priest's habit, which represents Alissa White-Gluz a pig who has a triangle on his fingers who wears a suit Tie that represents Daniel Erlandsson, a lord who has no face who holds a baby in his arms which represents Nick Cordle,   a rat who has a ruler in his hands that represents Michael Amott, a calf that has a flame in his hands he has a judge's outfit that represents Sharlee D'Angelo

Promotion
The first single and music video "War Eternal" was released on 20 March 2014. The video was the first of three produced and directed by Patric Ullaeus and his Revolver Film Company. A supporting tour of over 80 dates began in May 2014. On 27 May they released their second music video, "You Will Know My Name". The third video, "No More Regrets" was released the same week as the album.

A fourth music video for the track "Stolen Life" was released on 5 May 2015 which was the first to include Jeff Loomis on guitar. The track is almost identical to the album version, but it includes two extra solos recorded by Loomis.

Accolades

At the 2014 Burrn! magazine awards, War Eternal won Best Album and the title track won Best Tune.

Track listing

Personnel

Arch Enemy
 Alissa White-Gluz − Death growl,vocals
 Michael Amott − Electric guitar,guitars
 Nick Cordle − guitars,Keyboard instrument,keyboards
 Sharlee D'Angelo − Bass guitar,bass
 Daniel Erlandsson − Drum kit,drums,keyboards
 Jeff Loomis - Lead Guitar On stolen Life

Additional musicians
 Per Wiberg − mellotron
 Henrik Janson − orchestration, string arrangements
 Ulf Janson − keyboards, orchestration, string arrangements
 Stockholm Session Strings − strings

Production and design
 Michael Amott − production
 Daniel Erlandsson - engineering (guitars & bass)
 Nick Cordle - engineering (guitars & bass)
 Staffan Karlsson − engineering (vocals)
 Johan Örnborg − engineering (drums)
 Linn Fijal − engineering (strings & keyboards)
 Jens Bogren − mixing, mastering
 Costin Chioreanu − artwork, layout
 Patric Ullaeus − photography
 Jens Prüter − A&R

Charts

Release history

References

2014 albums
Arch Enemy albums
Century Media Records albums